The 2002 United States Senate election in New Hampshire was held on November 5, 2002. Incumbent Republican U.S. Senator Bob Smith was defeated in the Republican primary by U.S. Representative John E. Sununu. Sununu won the open seat, defeating Democratic Governor Jeanne Shaheen. , this was the last time the Republicans won the Class 2 Senate seat in New Hampshire.

Republican primary

Campaign 
Senator Bob Smith, the incumbent Republican Senator, briefly left the party in 1999 to run for president as an independent, claiming that the Republican platform was "not worth the paper it's written on". He rejoined the GOP a few months later, saying he made a mistake. Nonetheless, the party never fully forgave him, and some of his fellow Republican Senators went so far as to endorse his primary opponent, Rep. John Sununu, who would go on to win by more than eight percentage points.

Results

General election

Candidates
 Ken Blevens (Libertarian)
 Jeanne Shaheen, Governor of New Hampshire (Democratic)
 John E. Sununu, U.S. Representative (Republican)

Campaign

During the campaign, there was a major scandal that involved the use of a telemarketing firm hired by that state's Republican Party (NHGOP) for election tampering. The GOP Marketplace, based in Northern Virginia, jammed another phone bank being used by the state Democratic Party and the firefighters' union for efforts to turn out voters on behalf of then-governor Jeanne Shaheen on Election Day. The tampering involved using a call center to jam the phone lines of a Get Out the Vote (GOTV) operation. In the end, 900 calls were made for 45 minutes of disruption to the Democratic-leaning call centers. In addition to criminal prosecutions, disclosures in the case have come from a civil suit filed by the state's Democratic Party against the state's Republican Party (now settled). Four men have been convicted of, or pleaded guilty to, federal crimes and sentenced to prison for their involvement . One conviction has been reversed by an appeals court, a decision prosecutors are appealing. James Tobin, freed on appeal, was later indicted on charges of lying to the FBI during the original investigation.

Predictions

Results

See also 
 2002 United States Senate election

References 

New Hampshire
2002
2002 New Hampshire elections